No Straight Angles is the first full-length album by punk rock band No Fun at All, released in 1994.

Track listing
Believers   
Wow and I Say Wow   
Strong and Smart   
Growing Old, Growing Cold   
I Can't Believe It's True   
It Won't Be Long   
I Am Wrong and I Am Right   
Wisdom?   
So It Sadly Goes   
Beachparty   
Evil Worms   
Days in the Sun   
So Many Times   
Nothing I Wouldn't Do   
Happy for the First Time
Alcohol †
Don't Be a Pansy †

"Happy for the First Time" contains as a hidden track a new version of their song "What You Say", which originally appeared on the 1993 EP Vision.

"Strong and Smart" was later covered by the Swedish metal band In Flames as a bonus track to their album Clayman.

"Alcohol" is originally a song composed by the hardcore band Gang Green.

† = Exclusive to the 1995 Theologian Records American release. "Don't Be a Pansy" was originally released on a 1994 G-Spot Records compilation CD named "Rock Around The Clock" and on the No Straight Angles Maxi single.

1994 albums
No Fun at All albums
Burning Heart Records albums